Louis Fisher (March 20, 1913 – November 28, 2001) was the Socialist Labor Party of America candidate for United States President in the 1972 Presidential election and he was "the party's top vote-getting presidential candidate."  His vice presidential candidate was Genevieve Gunderson.

Fisher also ran for Governor of Illinois twice unsuccessfully; the party had run candidates for governor starting in 1896.  He also ran for Senator from Illinois four times: in 1956, 1960, 1968, 1970 and for Secretary of State of Illinois in 1944. He was also a political scholar and staunch opponent of the line-item veto.

References
 Ballot Access News Volume 17, Number 11 February 1, 2002

 The Political Graveyard: Index to Politicians: Fisher
 Social Security Death Index

1913 births
2001 deaths
Candidates in the 1972 United States presidential election
20th-century American politicians
Socialist Labor Party of America presidential nominees
Socialist Labor Party of America politicians from Illinois